Movlud Suleymanli, (Balakishiyev Movlud, the son of Suleyman) (born 18 March 1943) is an Azerbaijani prose writer, dramatist, screenwriter and film adviser.  He has been a member of the Union of Azerbaijani Writers since 1980, and is an honored art figure and the vice-chairman of the "Azerbaijan Television and Radio" limited company. Suleymanli has won the "Qızıl Qalam“ (Golden Pen) award of the Union of Azerbaijani Writers, and the All-union literary competition in the name of Maxim Gorky, with his first book published in the Russian language in Moscow.  He won the Qızıl Sünbül (Golden Ear) laureate of the Union of Azerbaijani Writers for "the best work dedicated to rustication". "Araz “ high literary award owing to his achievement in the field of fictional and non-fictional publicity, ANASAM award certificate owing to "Deportation“ novel and the best work of the year, estimation award of "Anadolu Conference".

Creativity
He began  his creativity with “My Hands” poem published in Azerbaijani Youth newspaper in 1964. In October 1940 he wrote the first author number of  “Fountain” broadcast  that  life of broadcast exceed 40 years. In 1974 Movlud Suleymanlı was awarded “Qızıl Qalam “ ( Golden  Pen ) of Union of Azerbaijani Writers, alleged to paramount role of broadcast in promulgation of Azerbaijani folk lore, ethnography, language and family life. In 1972 The Committee of Teleradio broadcasts sent him to Moscow for qualification courses. Writer was admitted to Azerbaijani Film Studio in the name of Jafar Jabbarly as a screenwriter in 1974. Fictional television films : "Abduction of groom"  on the basis of his scenari and “ our gamp is cloud" on an order of Moscow State Cinematography Committee were shot in 80 years. Association of Azerbaijani Writers invite Movlud Suleymanli to a job since 1976. He was the member of Union of Azerbaijani Writers since 1974. From 1976 to 1980, Movlud Suleymanlı was director of prosaic department in "Star"  journal that is the body of Association of Azerbaijani Writers and lead prosaic department of "Azerbaijan" journal that is more authoritative body of Association of Azerbaijani Writers. There were great changes in the variety of structures because of changes in Azerbaijani sociopolitical life. In these years, separate newspaper in the name of “ Oguz eli “(Oguz people ) was published by editor-in-chief of Movlud Suleymanli.  In these years  "Oguz eli" (Oguz people ) newspaper wrote by M. Süleymаnlı  had played a significant role in literary and cultural life of republic. "Mill"  (Dəyirman ) drama theatricalised on the basis of "Mill" novelette in Sumgait Drama Theatre in the name of Hüseyn Arablinski and "Betrayer" Ssatqın) in "Yug" theatre were staged.

Filmography 
 Ağstafa Şərabçıları (film, 1992) Winemakers of Agstafa 
 Bəyin oğurlanması (film, 1986) Abduction of groom 
 Bəylik dərsi (film, 2007)  Lesson of nobility 
 Çətirimiz buludlardır (film, 1976) Our umbrella is cloud 
 Dad (film, 1984) Taste 
 Deportasiya (film, 2001) Deportation
 Deportasiya. II Film (film) Deportation II Film (film) 
 Deportasiya. III Film (film) Deportation III Film (film) 
 Deportasiya. IV Film (film) Deportation IV Film (film) 
 Deportasiya. V Film (film) Deportation V Film (film) 
 Deportasiya. VI Film (film) Deportation VI Film (film) 
 Deportasiya. VII Film (film) Deportation VII Film (film)  
 Fatehlərin divanı (film, 1997) Conquers` reprisal 
 Hücum (film, 1989) Attack 
 Kökdən düşmüş piano (film, 1982) Piano outed of tune

References

External links
 Mövlud Süleymanlı azerbaijans.com – azərbaycanca
 azadliq.org
 kult.az – Mövlud Süleymanlı indi nə yazır
 news.lent.az
 media.azlink.info
 Mövlud Süleymanlı, Kamal Abdulla, Əsəd Cahangir və Etimad Başkeçidin debatı

1943 births
Living people
People from Tashir
Azerbaijani-language writers